LeRoy Sprankle (June 11, 1894 – September 25, 1972) was an American high school sports coach and athletics advocate in Eastern Tennessee and South Florida. Often referred to as the "Father of East Tennessee Sports", he had several notable accomplishments during his tenured career including: helping to standardize high school officiating in the state of Tennessee, pioneering interstate and international high school sports competition, and most notably, coaching several would-be prominent figures in American and sports history.

Early life
Sprankle was born on June 11, 1894 in Beach City, Ohio. He was the older brother of Dale R. Sprankle, who would also become famous as a college athletics coach and athletics director in Michigan. At the age of 16, his family moved to Canton, Ohio where he graduated from high school and first became involved in athletics. He then attended Mount Union College and competed in baseball, basketball, and football while completing a degree in mathematics. In 1918 Sprankle was drafted into the First World War, and served as a Second Lieutenant at Camp Gordon in Georgia. After Armistice, he resumed civilian life as the general manager of the Canton Independents professional basketball team. It was around this time that he became affiliated with the Canton Bulldogs professional football team and became good friends with several early football "legends", most notably Jim Thorpe.

Coaching career
Following the conclusion of the First World War, there was a great demand for qualified coaches. Likewise, LeRoy Sprankle was quickly contacted by a high school in Carrollton, Ohio to coach its basketball team. Despite having to commute by train and lodge overnight twice a week in order to keep his Canton job, Sprankle accepted the position out of his interest for helping boys. His success there warranted him an offer to coach in Tennessee at Kingsport High School (which was later renamed Dobyns-Bennett High School). In late 1921, he accepted the offer and became the head baseball, basketball, football, and track coach.

While at Kingsport, he became known for taking a keen interest in helping his players and students, many of whom went on to become noted for their life achievements. Over the course of the ten seasons that Sprankle coached football at the school, he compiled an 80–38–9 record, including a 193–0 victory over Norton High School from Virginia in 1926, one of the largest margins of victory in American football at any level. His track team won 3 state championships in 11 years, and he amassed a 117–61 record in baseball. Most notably, Sprankle's basketball team was a pioneer in interstate competition. At a time when it was rare to play games out of state, his team traveled annually across the state of Florida and the rest of the Southeast. In 1940, as part of the annual Florida trip, his team played a series of exhibition games in Cuba, one of the only high school sports teams ever to do so. Overall, Sprankle's basketball team at Dobyns-Bennett High School went 401–142, winning 18 championships.

In 1943, he and his family were forced to move to South Florida for health-related reasons. Nevertheless, he continued to coach, at Redlands High School in south Dade County, until 1953 when the school combined with Homestead High School. While retired from coaching, he worked with the new South Dade High School as business manager until he completely retired in 1964. Sprankle died in Homestead, Florida in 1972 at the age of 78, he was survived by his wife Jess, and his children, Rita and Dale. At his funeral, Bobby Dodd sent his remorse in a message that read: Sprankle became a second father to me and to hundreds of others like me.... Yes, I believe that LeRoy Sprankle has had more influence on the lives of the young people of Kingsport than any other person. I am sure he did, and I will always be grateful for the help he gave me.Since his death, the city of Kingsport, Tennessee has named a day in his honor. The gymnasium at the former Dobyns-Bennett High School (now John Sevier Middle School) was also dedicated after him.

Notable players coached

References

1894 births
1972 deaths
American men's basketball players
Mount Union Purple Raiders baseball players
Mount Union Purple Raiders football players
Mount Union Purple Raiders men's basketball players
High school baseball coaches in the United States
High school basketball coaches in Ohio
High school basketball coaches in Tennessee
High school football coaches in Tennessee
People from Beach City, Ohio
Basketball players from Canton, Ohio